The 20th BET Awards took place on June 28, 2020. The ceremony celebrates achievements in entertainment and honors music, sports, television, and movies. They also honored the many African-American people killed from police brutality and racial injustice in the United States. It was held virtually due to the effects of the COVID-19 lockdowns, and for the first time, was simulcast on broadcast television on the CBS Television Network, negating the need for a "roadblock" simulcast across all of the cable networks of ViacomCBS. The ceremony marks the award show's 20th year on air and the 40th anniversary of Black Entertainment Television, as well as the first-ever virtual ceremony in its history.

The nominees were announced on June 15, 2020. Drake received the most nominations with 6, ahead of Roddy Ricch and Megan Thee Stallion, who tied with five nominations each. It was also announced that same day that the ceremony will be hosted by actor and comedian Amanda Seales. Beyoncé was presented with the Humanitarian Award by Michelle Obama.

Performers

Winners and nominees

Notes 

  Brown Skin Girl makes Blue Ivy the youngest person to win a BET Award.

Special Awards
Humanitarian Award: 
Beyoncé

Shine A Light Award:  Honoree Recipients: DJ D-Nice (Club Quarantine), Swizz Beatz & Timbaland (Verzuz TV)

References

External links

 BET Awards 2020 Live Stream

BET Awards
2020 music awards
2020 awards
2020 awards in the United States